The Hamburger Ratsmusik was the name, in German, for the Hamburg city government musical establishment of Hamburg during the baroque period. Ratsmusik was a generic term to distinguish from Hausmusik, domestic music making, during the Hanseatic period.

It is also the name of a modern ensemble for early music. Hamburger Ratsmusik, led by Simone Eckert.

Directors
1608-1610 and 1613-1615 William Brade
1616- Christian Hildebrand
1621- Johann Schop, with a salary of 800 marks.
1665- Samuel Peter Sidon
1667- Dietrich Becker
1678- Nicolaus Adam Strungk
1682- Friedrich Nicolaus Brauns
1718- Hieronymus Oldenburg
1721- Georg Philipp Telemann
1768- Carl Philipp Emanuel Bach
1789- Christian Friedrich Gottlieb Schwenke, the last Musikdirector of the five churches.

References

German music history
History of Hamburg